Fred Donald Bessent (March 13, 1931 – July 7, 1990) was a pitcher in Major League Baseball. He pitched from 1955 to 1958 with the Brooklyn/Los Angeles Dodgers.

He was signed by the New York Yankees out of high school, and in his first professional season he pitched a no-hitter while going 22–7 in Class D. The following season, he moved up to the Class B Norfolk Tars and went 11–2 with a 2.04 earned run average. Bessent then developed a spinal condition and was unable to pitch in 1952. He underwent surgery and was subsequently drafted by the Dodgers.

From 1953 to 1955, Bessent pitched for the St. Paul Saints of the American Association. He was called up to the majors in July 1955 and immediately pitched well. That season, he went 8–1 with a 2.70 ERA, mostly coming out of the bullpen. He also pitched 3 scoreless innings in the 1955 World Series, and the Dodgers won their first championship.

Bessent pitched just as well in 1956, going 4–3 with nine saves and a 2.50 ERA. The Dodgers won another National League pennant but lost the World Series to the New York Yankees, despite Bessent's win in Game 2. He pitched the final seven innings of a 13–8 slugfest after both teams'  starting pitchers were knocked out in the second inning.

In 1957, he dropped off sharply, posting a 5.73 ERA in 44 innings. He began to develop arm problems shortly afterwards and played his final major league game in September 1958. He retired in 1962, after several unsuccessful seasons in the minors.
He was survived by three daughters, who remained in Jacksonville.

Bessent returned to Jacksonville and became a sales representative. He died of alcohol poisoning in 1990.

References

External links
 
Venezuelan Professional Baseball League statistics

1931 births
1990 deaths
Accidental deaths in Florida
Alcohol-related deaths in Florida
Baseball players from Jacksonville, Florida
Brooklyn Dodgers players
Deaths by poisoning
Jacksonville Suns players
LaGrange Troupers players
Leones del Caracas players
American expatriate baseball players in Venezuela
Los Angeles Dodgers players
Major League Baseball pitchers
Norfolk Tars players
Robert E. Lee High School (Jacksonville) alumni
Rochester Red Wings players
St. Paul Saints (AA) players
Spokane Indians players